Yevgeni Nikolayevich Ponasenkov (Russian: Евгений Николаевич Понасенков; March 13, 1982) is a Russian publicist and media personality. He has written about the Napoleonic era in Russia and is the author of two historical monographs.

Biography

Career 
From 2003 to 2010 Ponasenkov was presenter of the author's columnist for Kommersant Vlast, Russia's most important political weekly.

In March 2006 the premiere of his play  The German Saga  (Russian: Немецкая сага) took place at the Meyerhold Theater and Cultural Center, Moscow.

In 2008 Ponasenkov directed the classical music programme of the  House of Olympic Friends  (Russian: Дома друзей Олимпиады), the cultural centre of the Russian delegation at the Olympic Games in Beijing. 

In 2009, opera singer Elena Obraztsova invited him to direct the celebration of her jubilee (theatrical performances in the Bolshoi Theatre and the Column Hall of the House of Unions). 

In June 2010 Ponasenkov performed the main male role in a theatrical production based on his own play  The Last Tango of Lili Marleen (Russian: Последнее танго Лили Марлен) in the Moscow International House of Music. 

In 2012 the premiere of his feature documentary  The Mystery of the Bay of Naples  (Italy, 105 min, 2012; Russian: «Мистерии Неаполитанского залива», Italian: "Misteri del Golfo di Napoli") took place directed by Ponasenkov at the invitation of the Italian government. 

Since January 2013 he has been the presenter of the author's programme about world cinema on  Moscow. Trust  (Russian:  Москва. Доверие).

On 1 April 2022, Ponasenkov was put on a list of ‘Foreign Agent Media’ by the Russian Ministry of Justice.

Bibliography

References 

Historians of Russia
1982 births
Living people
Russian YouTubers
Pseudohistorians
Russian television presenters
Russian theatre directors
21st-century Russian male actors
Russian male television actors
Russian male film actors
Russian atheists
Critics of religions
Russian activists against the 2022 Russian invasion of Ukraine
People listed in Russia as media foreign agents